Fraser Land District is a land district (cadastral division) of Western Australia partly within the Eucla and Eastern divisions of the state. It spans roughly 31°40'S - 32°25'S in latitude and 122°15'E - 123°10'E in longitude.

Location and features
The district is located on the Nullarbor Plain about half-way between the towns of Norseman and Balladonia. The Eyre Highway forms part of the southern boundary of the district, and the Fraser Range is entirely contained within it.

History
The district was approved on 3 September 1897 by the Commissioner of Crown Lands. As it was approved prior to the Land Act 1898, its boundaries were never gazetted.

References

Land districts of Western Australia
Goldfields-Esperance